The Unknown Known (also known as The Unknown Known: The Life and Times of Donald Rumsfeld) is a 2013 American documentary film about the political career of former U.S. Secretary of Defense and congressman Donald Rumsfeld, directed by Academy Award winning documentarian and filmmaker Errol Morris. The film is a summary of 33 hours of interviews that Morris conducted with Rumsfeld over eleven separate sessions during visits to Newton, Massachusetts. The film was released on April 4, 2014, by Radius-TWC and is dedicated to the memory of Roger Ebert.

Synopsis
The major portion of the film is spent addressing excerpts from the countless memos, nicknamed 'Yellow Perils' by his first Pentagon staff and 'Snowflakes' by the second, that Rumsfeld wrote during his time as a congressman and advisor to four different presidents, twice as United States Secretary of Defense. It also focuses on a response Rumsfeld gave to a question at a U.S. Department of Defense news briefing on February 12, 2002, about the lack of evidence linking the government of Iraq with the supply of weapons of mass destruction to terrorist groups. The content of the memos are varied, covering everything from the aftermath of Watergate, to the torture and abuse of prisoners at Abu Ghraib, to the definition of the word "terrorism". Morris returns to the motif of snowflakes swirling within a globe throughout the documentary as he discusses the memos with Rumsfeld, the contents of which the Defense Secretary allowed him limited access to while preparing the film, and several of which Rumsfeld agrees to read aloud on camera.

At the beginning of the documentary, Rumsfeld argues that a major purpose of the Department of Defense is to evaluate "unknown knowns," or "the things you think you know, that it turns out you did not," to anticipate hostile actions before they take place. Illustrating his point, Rumsfeld suggests that the failure of the United States to anticipate the attack on Pearl Harbor was a failure of imagination.

 As the interviews proceed, the director attempts to present several contradictions of fact and past statements. Rumsfeld does not always directly acknowledge, or engage in deeper discourse, and at times deflects the points raised — according to various editorials. Though, when the director asks him about lessons he learnt from the Vietnam War, for example, Rumsfeld straightforwardly states: "Some things work out, some things don’t; that didn’t." Rumsfeld also expresses good-natured surprise at the recognition of a list of successful torture techniques — including hooding, stress positions, and nudity — that he personally approved for use on Guantánamo detainees, stating, "Good grief! That’s a pile of stuff!" In follow up, Morris questions him about the so-called "Torture Memos" describing enhanced interrogation techniques. When Rumsfeld indicates that he never read them, Morris responds in disbelief, "Really?" When asked if the Iraq War was a mistake, Rumsfeld replies, "I guess time will tell."

In the penultimate scene, Morris questions him again about "unknown knowns," and the definition given by Rumsfeld has inverted, a discongruence the director is quick to point out, and which Rumsfeld acknowledges: "unknown knowns" are "things that you know, that you don't know you know." As the documentary closes, Morris asks Rumsfeld why he agreed to the interviews. Rumsfeld responds, "That is a vicious question. I'll be darned if I know."

Cast
 Donald Rumsfeld as (interviewee) himself
 Errol Morris as (interviewer, voice) himself
 Kenn Medeiros as younger Donald Rumsfeld / Secret Service

Release
The Unknown Known was screened in the main competition section at the 70th Venice International Film Festival, and premiered at the Telluride Film Festival on August 29, 2013.

Critical reception
On Rotten Tomatoes the documentary has an approval rating of 82% based on 105 reviews with an average rating of 6.81/10. The website's critical consensus reads, "Viewers hoping to see Donald Rumsfeld admit making mistakes in public office may find The Unknown Known frustrating – but no less fascinating." On Metacritic, the film has a weighted average score of 69 out of 100, based on 30 critics, indicating "generally favorable reviews".

David Denby of The New Yorker wrote, "If Morris doesn’t quite nail Rumsfeld, his questions lead the Secretary to nail himself. You watch him obfuscate, fudge the issue of torture, smirk about George H. W. Bush (whom he doesn’t like), and offer dull commonplaces when impassioned clarity is called for." Mary Corliss of Time wrote, "Morris's movie is a cat-and-mouse game, and Rumsfeld is the cat, virtually licking his chops as he toys with, and then devours, another rival."  Colin Colvert of the Minneapolis Star Tribune wrote, "Morris is admirably evenhanded, never demonizing his subject, but giving him enough rope to hang himself. Rumsfeld, cool and bemused, refuses to knot the noose."

Comparisons to The Fog of War
 
Several reviews of the documentary compare it to Morris's Academy Award-winning predecessor, The Fog of War (2003), with the follow-up being described as a "spiritual sequel". The earlier documentary is about Robert McNamara, the longest serving U.S. Secretary of Defense, with Rumsfeld being the second. Both are film interviews of former Defense Secretary octogenarians who were dismissed prematurely from their posts, and who discuss their roles as the voice of some of the most unpopular wars in recent American history – for McNamara, Vietnam and for Rumsfeld, Iraq.

At one point, Morris asks Rumsfeld, "Have you seen The Fog of War? What do you think about that?" to which Rumsfeld responds, "I hate it. That man had nothing to apologize for." Morris himself has been resistant to comparisons, stating "You can’t call this ‘The Fog of War 2.’ I can’t imagine two individuals more unalike."

See also

 Abu Ghraib torture and prisoner abuse
 Electoral history of Donald Rumsfeld
 Enhanced interrogation techniques
 Epistemic modal logic
 Foreign policy of the George W. Bush administration
 Gerald Ford
 George H. W. Bush
 George W. Bush
 Guantanamo Bay detention camp
 Hamdan v. Rumsfeld
 Iraq War
 Known and Unknown: A Memoir
 List of United States Secretaries of Defense by time in office
 National Security Strategy (United States)
 Overseas interventions of the United States
 'There are known knowns'
 Torture Memos
 United States Secretary of Defense 
 Vietnam War

References

External links
 
 
 
 
 The Unknown Known at RogerEbert.com
 

2013 films
2013 documentary films
American documentary films
Documentary films about American politicians
Films directed by Errol Morris
Films produced by Errol Morris
HanWay Films films
Films scored by Danny Elfman
Donald Rumsfeld
2010s English-language films
2010s American films